Amblyomma albopictum is a species of tropical hard ticks. It is typically found parasitizing Cyclura nubila, Chilabothrus angulifer, Cubophis cantherigerus, Leiocephalus carinatus, and less commonly the Paraguaian hairy dwarf porcupine. The species has been found in Costa Rica, Cuba, Haiti, Honduras and the Dominican Republic, and has also been reported but not confirmed in Brazil. The tick was described by Louis Georges Neumann in 1899.

References

albopictum
Arachnids of North America
Animals described in 1899